Triumph of the Nerds is a 1996 British/American television documentary, produced by John Gau Productions and Oregon Public Broadcasting for Channel 4 and PBS. It explores the development of the personal computer in the United States from World War II to 1995. It was first screened as three episodes between 14 and 28 April 1996 on Channel 4, and as a single programme on 16 December 1996 on PBS.

Triumph of the Nerds was written and hosted by Robert X. Cringely (Mark Stephens) and based on his 1992 book Accidental Empires. The documentary comprises interviews with important figures connected with the personal computer, including Steve Jobs, Steve Wozniak, Bill Gates, Steve Ballmer, Paul Allen, Bill Atkinson, Andy Hertzfeld, Ed Roberts, and Larry Ellison. It also includes archival footage of Gary Kildall and commentary from Douglas Adams, the author of the science fiction series The Hitchhiker's Guide to the Galaxy. The title Triumph of the Nerds is a play on the title of the 1984 comedy Revenge of the Nerds.

Cringely followed the series with Nerds 2.0.1 (titled Glory of the Geeks in the UK), a history of the Internet to 1998. In 2012, Cringely released the full interview that Steve Jobs gave in 1995 for Triumph of the Nerds as Steve Jobs: The Lost Interview.

Episodes
As broadcast by Channel 4:

 Impressing Their Friends (14 April 1996)
 Riding the Bear (21 April 1996)
 Great Artists Steal (28 April 1996)

Interviewees

 Douglas Adams
 Paul Allen
 Bill Atkinson
 Steve Ballmer
 Dan Bricklin
 David Bunnell
 Rod Canion
 Christine Comaford
 Esther Dyson
 Larry Ellison
 Chris Espinosa
 Gordon Eubanks
 Lee Felsenstein
 Bob Frankston
 Harry Garland
 Bill Gates
 Adele Goldberg
 Andy Hertzfeld
 Steve Jobs
 Gary Kildall
 Roger Melen
 Bob Metcalfe
 Gordon Moore
 Tim Paterson
 Jeff Raikes
 Ed Roberts
 Arthur Rock
 John Sculley
 Charles Simonyi
 Bob Taylor
 Larry Tesler
 John Warnock
 Jim Warren
 Steve Wozniak

Reception and influence
Triumph of the Nerds was a successful series and Cringely noted in a 1998 interview that it was "a stalwart of [PBS] pledge drives all across America."

Steve Wozniak discussed the film on the letters portion of his official website stating: "I liked Triumph of the Nerds. It was one of the best shows ever created of that kind. Everyone has the same opinion, so why ask me? I'm not a history expert and couldn't tell you what it missed or got wrong, but it seemed extremely thorough and insightful."

Actor Noah Wyle has also stated that after initially resisting the role, he finally agreed to portray Steve Jobs in the 1999 film Pirates of Silicon Valley after viewing Triumph of the Nerds.

References

Further reading
 Walter Goodman. "TELEVISION REVIEW:Mapping Cyberspace in Bay Area Garages." New York Times, 12 June 1996.
 Liesl Schillinger. "The Double Life of Robert X. Cringely." Wired magazine 6.12, December 1998.

External links 
 
 
 Triumph of the Nerds at the Internet Archive

1996 television films
1996 documentary films
1996 films
1990s English-language films
American documentary television films
British documentary films
British television films
Documentary films about computer and internet entrepreneurs
Films about technological impact
Nerd culture
PBS original programming
Works about Apple Inc.
Works about Microsoft
Films about Steve Jobs
Bill Gates
Larry Ellison
1990s American films
1990s British films